KRIF Hockey is an ice-hockey club based in Kallinge outside Ronneby, Sweden. They compete in Hockeyettan, the third tier of ice hockey in Sweden.

References

Ice hockey teams in Sweden
Ice hockey teams in Blekinge County